The 2012 KNSB Dutch Allround Championships in speed skating were held at the Thialf ice stadium in Heerenveen, Netherlands from 4 to 5 February 2012. The tournament is part of the 2011/2012 speed skating season.

Schedule

Medalists

Allround

Distance

Men's results

Source men: Schaatsstatistieken.nl

Women's results

Source women: Schaatsstatistieken.nl

References

KNSB Dutch Allround Championships
KNSB Dutch Allround Championships
2012 Allround
KNSB Dutch Allround Championships, 2012